The 1978 Central Michigan Chippewas football team represented Central Michigan University in the Mid-American Conference (MAC) during the 1978 NCAA Division I-A football season. In their first season under head coach Herb Deromedi, the Chippewas compiled a 9–2 record (8–1 against MAC opponents), finished in second place in the MAC standings, held seven of eleven opponents to fewer than ten points, and outscored all opponents, 331 to 119. The season marked the beginning of a school record 23-game unbeaten streak that ran from October 7, 1978, to October 11, 1980. The team played its home games in Perry Shorts Stadium in Mount Pleasant, Michigan, with attendance of 98,011 in five home games.

The team's statistical leaders included quarterback Gary Hogeboom with 1,095 passing yards, Willie Todd with 746 rushing yards, and Brian Blank with 384 receiving yards. Linebacker Bryan Gross received the team's most valuable player award. Offensive guard Tim Sopha, placekicker Rade Savich, and defensive back Robert Jackson received first-team All-MAC honors. Savich broke the school record with 15 field goals in a season and tied a school record with 38 point after touchdown kicks in a season.

Herb Deromedi, a native of Royal Oak, Michigan, was hired as Central Michigan's head football coach in August 1978. He had previously been the Chippewas' defensive coordinator under head coach Roy Kramer. He replaced Kramer, who left the program to become the athletic director at Vanderbilt University. Deromedi remained the program's head football coach for 16 years, compiling a 110–55–10 record. He was inducted into the College Football Hall of Fame in 2007.

Schedule

References

Central Michigan
Central Michigan Chippewas football seasons
Central Michigan Chippewas football